Kaunteya refers to the epithets of Yudhishthira, Bhima, and Arjuna, the Pandava children of Kunti in the Hindu epic Mahabharata. It is sometimes also used as an epithet of Karna, the eldest child of Kunti.

References

External links 
 The Mahābhārata of Vyasa, translated from Sanskrit into English by Kisari Mohan Ganguli and published online at sacred-texts.com.
 Chakravarti V. Narasimhan; The Mahabharata. Columbia University Press, 1965.

 Characters in the Mahabharata
 Characters in the Bhagavata Purana